Tamayo may refer to:

Tamayo (surname), a surname
Tamayo, Dominican Republic, a municipality in the Dominican Republic
Tamayo (Demon Slayer: Kimetsu no Yaiba), a character in the manga series Demon Slayer: Kimetsu no Yaiba

People with the given name
Tamayo Akiyama, Japanese author
, Japanese video game composer
Tamayo Marukawa, Japanese politician
, Japanese social worker and politician

See also
Rincón de Tamayo, a community in  Celaya, Guanajuato in Mexico

Japanese feminine given names